"You Used to Hold Me" is a song by Scottish DJ Calvin Harris. The song was released on 8 February 2010 as the fourth and final single from his second studio album, Ready for the Weekend. The song marked the last time Harris regularly sang for his songs, as since 2011 he has almost always focused on music production while having guest singers provide the vocals for him.

Release and promotion
To promote "You Used to Hold Me", Harris sang the song on 4Music along with other songs from his new album Ready for the Weekend. He also performed the song at the Big Day Out in Australia and featured it on the setlist of his Ready for the Weekend tour.

Critical reception

The BBC commented on the song:–

Chart performance
On 29 January 2010, "You Used to Hold Me" first entered the Irish Singles Chart at number 45. The following week, on 5 February 2010, the single climbed to a new peak of number 37. The single first entered the UK Singles Chart on 31 January 2010, at number 47. On 7 February 2010, it rose to number 38. That same week, the single also entered the UK Dance Chart, reaching a current peak of number four.

Music video
The music video was filmed in November 2009. The video shows Harris driving around in a monster truck and girls dancing in front of a wall while Harris sings the song in the truck and performs it on some CDJs and mixer.

Track listing

Charts

Certifications

References

Calvin Harris songs
Songs written by Calvin Harris
2009 songs
2010 singles
Columbia Records singles
Sony Music singles